Marko Milićević, most known as Gramophonedzie, is a Serbian DJ from Belgrade. He is best known for his 2010 single "Why Don't You", which peaked at number 12 on the UK Singles Chart and was on Now 75.

Music career

Early beginnings
He started his career in the year 2000 as participant at the Irish RedBull Music Academy. Milićević is known for producing the theme songs for Balkan versions of the TV show Big Brother. He also already played at events alongside Tom Novy, Basement Jaxx, Junior Jack and Bob Sinclar to name a few.

2010–present: Breakthrough
His debut single "Why Don't You" was released in the UK on 1 March 2010, the song entered the UK Singles Chart on 7 March 2010 at number 12. The song has also peaked to number 7 in Belgium, number 19 in the Netherlands and number 61 in Switzerland. In December 2010 he released the single "Out of My Head". In June 2012 he released the single "No Sugar", with Joey Negro & Shea Soul. In November 2012 he released the single "Number One". In 2013 he released the single "Not My Groove".

Discography

Singles

Remixes

Awards and nominations

References

External links

Serbian DJs
Living people
Musicians from Belgrade
Serbian electronic musicians
1979 births
House musicians
Serbian house musicians
Electronic dance music DJs
MTV Europe Music Award winners
Pesma za Evroviziju contestants